The Cherven Cities or Cherven Gords, often literally translated as Red Cities, Red Forts or Red Boroughs, was a point of dispute between the Kingdom of Poland and Kievan Rus' at the turn of 10th and 11th centuries, with both sides claiming their rights to the land.

Etymology
Originally, the name "Cherven Cities" probably identified a territory between the Bug and Wieprz rivers. Its name is derived from Czerwień (cf. Proto-Slavic *čьrvenъ "red"), a gord that existed there, possibly on the site of the present village of Czermno. The first mention of the "Cherven cities" is given by the Primary Chronicle (12th century), when Volodymyr the Great captured them from the Lyakhs (Poles) in 981.

History

The Cherven Cities first described in the Primary Chronicle by Nestor the Chronicler have a central role in the history of the Early Medieval Polish-Ruthenian borderlands. The area is first mentioned in 981, when  Vladimir the Great took it during his expansion campaign to the west.

Cosmas of Prague (c. 1045 – 1125) relates that the Přemyslid rulers of Bohemia controlled the land of Kraków until 999. In support of Cosmas, the foundation charter of the Archdiocese of Prague (1086) traces the Eastern border of the archdiocese, as established in 973, along the Bug and Styr (or Stryi) rivers, which marked the approximate boundaries of the region where Cherven Cities were located. Abraham ben Jacob, who travelled in Eastern Europe in 965, remarks that Boleslaus II of Bohemia ruled the country "stretching from the city of Prague to the city of Kraków".

In the 970s, it is assumed that Mieszko I of Poland took over the region: the Primary Chronicle infers this when reporting that Volodymyr the Great conquered the Cherven Cities from the Lyakhs (an alternative archaic name for Poles) in 981. Nestor writes in his chronicle that: "Volodymyr marched upon the Lyakhs and took their cities: Peremyshl (Przemyśl), Cherven (Czermno), and other towns". However, historian Leontii Voitovych speculates that contrary to Nestor's account in the Primary Chronicle, if the lands were under control of the Duchy of Poland then the Kievan Rus' conquest would have been an open call for war between the principalities with an inevitable long struggle, but such a thing did not happen according to Voitovych, possibly indicating in Voitovych's view that the lands and its population weren't Polish, but an independent political-tribal union with some vassalage to Bohemia. In the following decades, the contested region would change hands between Poland and Rus' several more times.

In 1018, Poland re-took the area under Bolesław I the Brave, and in 1031 it fell again to Rus'. The Rus'ian expedition against Poland (1030–1031) had as its object not only the recovery of territories previously lost in 1018; it also delivered a powerful blow against the Polish Metropolis of Slavonic rite. In 1031, Harald and his men reached the land of the Kievan Rus, where they served the armies of Yaroslav I the Wise, the Grand Prince of the Rus, whose wife Ingigerd was a distant relative of Harald. In the spring 1031, where he became chief of Yaroslav's bodyguard jointly with Eilifr, son of that Rognvaldr who had originally come to Novgorod with Ingigerd. Harald served a military apprenticeship, fighting in the Polish campaign of 1031, and against the Læsir (Lendians). The gord of Sutiejsk was most likely founded in 1034 - 1039 by Grand Prince Yaroslav the Wise, who built the fortified settlement to guard the border with Poland. Around the year 1069, the region again returned to Poland, after Bolesław II the Generous retook the area and the city of Przemyśl, making it his temporary residence. Then in 1085, the region became a principality under the lordship of Rus', known as the Principality of Peremyshl.

See also
Czerwień
Lędzianie
Red Ruthenia
Sutiejsk

References

Historical regions in Poland
History of Red Ruthenia
History of Kievan Rus'
History of Poland during the Piast dynasty
History of Lublin Voivodeship
History of Lviv Oblast
History of Podkarpackie Voivodeship